The Black & Blue World Tour was their fifth worldwide concert tour by the Backstreet Boys in support of their fourth album Black & Blue (2000) and the world tour took place in 2001. The first leg of the tour kicked off January 22, 2001 in the United States. The second leg began June 8 in the group's hometown of Orlando, Florida, and was temporarily put on hold July 9, in order for group member A. J. McLean to seek treatment for clinical depression which led to anxiety attacks and the excessive consumption of alcohol. The tour resumed August 24 in Milwaukee, Wisconsin, and wrapped up October 19 in Paradise, Nevada. The Boys then continued their tour around the world before it came to a close by the end of 2001. It grossed over US $315 million worldwide, becoming the highest-grossing concert tour by an artist in general of the year. The tour was sponsored by Burger King, Kellogg's and Polaroid.

On September 11, 2001, band member Brian Littrell's wife Leighanne and the band's crew member Daniel Lee were scheduled to fly from Boston, where the group played their fifth sold-out show the night before, back to Los Angeles aboard American Airlines Flight 11. Leighanne Littrell canceled her flight the night before as she wanted to spend more time with her husband, but Lee was one of 92 people killed aboard Flight 11 after it was hijacked and crashed into the North Tower of the World Trade Center in New York City. Near the end of the concert in Toronto on September 12, 2001, Littrell gave a brief speech about crew member Daniel Lee, who was on board American Airlines Flight 11, which was hijacked and deliberately crashed into the North Tower of the World Trade Center on 9/11, and led the entire audience in a moment of silence for Lee and all those who died that day.

Opening acts
Myra
Krystal Harris
Destiny's Child (January 27–February 15, 2001)
Shaggy (June 8–July 7, 2001)
Sisqó (August 24–October 19, 2001)

Setlist

Tour dates

Festivals and other miscellaneous performances
Wango Tango
The Concert for New York City
United We Stand: What More Can I Give

Cancellations and rescheduled shows

Personnel
Lead Vocals: Kevin Richardson, Brian Littrell, Howie Dorough, Nick Carter, AJ McLean
Tour Director: 
Tour Manager: Paul 'Skip' Rickert
Assistant Tour Manager: Tim Krieg
Co-Director: Denise McLean
Co-Director: Nicole Peltz
Press Liaison: Leila Eminson
Tour Accountant: Vincent Corry
Staff Photographer: Andre Csillig
Musical Director: 
Costume Design: Jill Focke, Kerstin 'Kiki' Theileis, Janine Schreiber
Choreographer: Fatima Robinson
Assistant Choreographer: Richard "Swoop" Whitebear*
Web Master: Leigh Dorough (née Boniello)*

Security
Billy Evans: Head of Security/Nick's Security
Nelson Monteiro: Brian's Security
Raul Ibanez: Howie's Security
Marcus Johnson: AJ's Security
Carlos Cardenas: Kevin's Security

Band
Keyboards: Darrell Smith, Dave Delhomme
Guitars: Andy Abad, Tariqh Akoni
Percussion: Ramon Yslas
Bass: Sam Sims
Drums: Teddy Campbell

Dancers
Shannon Lopez
Earl "Sleepy" Manning*
Michelle Molchanov (now Landau)
Reginald "Reggie" Jackson*
Lisa Fraser
Richmond "Rich" Talauega**
Anthony "Tone" Talauega**
Nikki Tuazon 
Earl "Punch" Wright 
Russell Wright

Info
 indicates which dancer appear in the last tour
Rich and Tone also choreograph the Boys' reminding tours: Never Gone, IAWLT and their Vegas residency
Leigh, who was dating Howie at the time, later became his wife in 2007 after six years of dating since meeting in December 6, 2000

References

Backstreet Boys concert tours
2001 concert tours